Orthoceratidae is an extinct family of actively mobile carnivorous cephalopods, subclass Nautiloidea, that lived in what would be North America, Europe, Asia, Africa, and Australia from the Ordovician through Triassic from 490—203.7 mya, existing for approximately .

Taxonomy
Orthoceratidae was named by McCoy (1844) and assigned to the Orthocerida by Teichert and Miller (1939),(as Orthocerotidae); to the Michelinoceratida by Flower (1962), and to the Orthocerataceae by Sweet (1964). It has been subsequently included in the Orthocerataceae in Evans (1994) and in the Orthocerida in Evans (2005)  and in Kröger et al. (2007). Flower showed in 1962 that Orthocerotidae used by Teichert and Miller (1939) is synonymous with Orthoceratide McCoy (1884).

Morphology
Members are characterised by long, slender, usually orthoconic (straight) but sometimes slightly curved shells, a central or subcentral orthochoanitic siphuncle that is free of deposits, a long body chamber, and cylindrical or only slightly inflated connecting rings. Ornamentation may be in the form of longitudinal or transverse ribs and/or lirae, or the shell surface may be smooth.

References 

 Dzik, Jerzy  (1984) Phylogeny of the Nautiloidea, Palaeontologica Polonica, no. 43

Orthocerida
Prehistoric cephalopod families
Ordovician first appearances
Permian extinctions